Pukara (Aymara for fortress, also named Pucara Grande) is a mountain in the Andes of Bolivia which reaches a height of approximately . It is located in the Oruro Department, Mejillones Province, Carangas Municipality, north of Yapu Qullu.

References 

Mountains of Oruro Department